Legerella is a genus of parasitic alveolates of the phylum Apicomplexa. Species in this genus that usually infect the malpighian tubules of invertebrates.

Legerella helminthorum infects the intestinal cells of the nematode Mononchus composticola

Legerella testiculi infects the testes of the millipede Glomeris marginata.

The type species is Legerella nova.

History
The genus was created by Félix Mesnil in 1900.

Taxonomy
There are five species known in this genus.

Description
The oocyst contains numerous sporozoites. Sporocysts do not occur.

Host records
L. helminthorum - nematode (Mononchus composticola)
L. hydropori - beetle (Hydroporus palustris)
L. testiculi - millipede (Glomeris marginata)

References

Apicomplexa genera